Badarkhali is a village in southeastern Bangladesh and a Union Parishad. Built on the banks of the Moheshkhali Channel, and has a population of over 47,000. It is located 120 km south of Chittagong and in Cox's Bazar District. The modern Badarkhali derives its name from Badar Shah. In 1340 Badar Shah and the twelve Awlias, along with the Sufi general Syed Nasiruddin defeated King Achak Narayan of Tungachal and established Muslim rule there.

Geography and climate
Badarkhali is located at 21.7193635 °N, 91.9499643 °E. It has 5,000 household units and total area about 9 square kilometer. The main river flowing on Badarkhali is Moheshkhali channel.

It is surrounded by Dorbeshkhata on the north, and Moheshkhali Channel on the south, east and west.

Economy
Badarakhali Union's economy depends mainly on agriculture and fisheries.

Administration
List of Para
 Kutubdia Para (Block No.-01)
 Kutubdia Para (Block No.-02)
 Azam Nagar
 Bazar Para
 Veruakhali Para
 Sanua Para
 Chowdhury Para
 Datinakhali Para
 Demusiya Para
 Khalakaca Para
 Kutubnagar Para
 Maganama Para
 Majher Para
 Natun Ghona
 Tecchi Para
 Noya Para
 Sahariya Para
 Pukuria Para
 Oyapada Para
 Tutiyakhali Para
 Lambakhali Para
 Muhuri Para
 Napitakhali Para
 Gudham Para
 Satadaliya Para
 Matarabari Para

Badarkhali Union Parisad consists of a chairman and twelve members including three members exclusively reserved for women. Union Parishads are formed under the Local Government (Union Parishads) Act, 2009. The boundary of each Union is demarcated by the Deputy Commissioner of Cox's Bazar District. Union Council is the body primarily responsible for agricultural, industrial and community development within the local limits of the union.

List of Chairman

Education
The education system of Badarkhali is similar to that of Bangladesh.

 Madrassah
 Badarkhali M.S Fazil Degree Madrassah
 Azamnagar Majidia Dhakil Madrassah

College
 Badarkhali Degree College

High Schools
 Badarkhali Colonization High School
 Al Azahar High School

Primary Schools
 Kutub Nogor Government Primary School
 Badarkhli Govt. Primary School

Gallery

See also
Writer ;
1.Dr Fared faruque-poet
2. Naym Qader,
3. Sm Saiful mostafa-poet,
 Villages of Bangladesh
 Upazilas of Bangladesh
 Districts of Bangladesh
 Divisions of Bangladesh

References

Unions of Chakaria Upazila